Gustav Ernesaks (2 August 1896, Harjumaa, Governorate of Estonia – 2 September 1932, Sydney, Australia) was an Estonian weightlifter.

Achievements

References

1896 births
1932 deaths
Estonian male weightlifters
Olympic weightlifters of Estonia
Weightlifters at the 1924 Summer Olympics